Thomas Carroll Neal Jr. (January 28, 1914 – August 7, 1972) was an American actor and successful amateur boxer best known for his costarring role in the critically lauded film Detour, for having a widely publicized affair with actress Barbara Payton, and for later being convicted and imprisoned for manslaughter.

Career
Born in Evanston, Illinois, Neal was one of three children born to banker Thomas, Sr. and Mayme Neal (née Martin). He had two older sisters, Mary Elizabeth and Dorothy Helen.
His great uncle was John Drew, the noted thespian. Neal and his sisters were raised in a spacious ten-room home in Chicago. He attended Lake Forest Academy and Evanston Township High School before enrolling at Northwestern University where he majored in mathematics. During college, Neal played several sports and, for a time, competed in amateur boxing matches. He was also a member of the Sigma Chi fraternity and was active in the drama club.

Neal dropped out of Northwestern after a year, and moved back to Chicago. He appeared in various stage productions in summer stock before making his way to New York City in 1933. Neal made his Broadway debut in 1935. In 1938, he first appeared in film in Out West with the Hardys, part of the Mickey Rooney "Hardy family" movie series.

Neal appeared in many low budget B-movies in the 1940s/1950s. In 1941 he starred with Frances Gifford in the Republic Pictures 15-episode serial Jungle Girl. Perhaps his most memorable role was that of Al Roberts in the classic film noir Detour alongside Ann Savage. They went on to make five movies together.

Personal life
Neal was married three times and had one child. His first marriage was to actress and singer Vicky Lane whom he married in 1944. Lane divorced Neal in 1949, citing "mental and physical cruelty."

In the early 1950s, Neal met actress Barbara Payton at a party. The two began dating, but Payton ended the relationship after meeting and becoming engaged to actor Franchot Tone. Despite her engagement, Payton began seeing Neal again. On September 14, 1951, Neal, Payton, and Tone made headlines after Neal got into a physical altercation with Tone over Payton in her front yard. Neal beat Tone severely while Payton reportedly watched the fight. Tone suffered severe injuries, including a smashed cheekbone, a broken nose, and a brain concussion, for which he was hospitalized. After he recovered, Tone and Payton married on September 28, 1951. Payton left Tone after 53 days and returned to Neal. Tone filed for divorce in March 1952, citing Payton for adultery. Neal and Payton announced their engagement in May 1953, but eventually ended their relationship later that year.

Shortly after their breakup, Neal married Patricia Fenton. His only child, Patrick Thomas Neal, was born in 1957. Fenton died the following year from cancer. In 1992, Patrick Neal (who goes by the name Tom Neal, Jr.) appeared in one film, playing the role of Al Roberts in a 1992 independent remake of Detour.

Later years and death
After his much publicized fight with Franchot Tone, Neal was blacklisted in Hollywood, as was Payton. He acted sporadically but became more known for his tumultuous on-and-off relationship with Payton. Neal and Payton attempted to capitalize on the interest in their relationship by starring together in the low-budget Western The Great Jesse James Raid in 1953. The film did reasonably well but did nothing to revitalize the couple's careers. In June 1953, Neal and Payton accepted an offer to star in the touring production of The Postman Always Rings Twice. Their performances were largely panned and the tour ended in September 1953. Neal and Payton broke up for the final time in November 1953.

With his acting career over, Neal moved to Palm Springs, California, and became a gardener. He later started his own landscaping business. In 1961, Neal married receptionist Gail Bennett in Las Vegas. On April 2, 1965, police were summoned to the couple's Palm Springs home by Neal's attorney. They discovered Bennett's body on the couch partially covered by a blanket with a gunshot wound in the back of her head. It was later determined that Bennett had been shot with a .45 caliber gun on April 1. Neal, who was not at the home when police arrived, became an immediate suspect. He surrendered to police on April 3 and was indicted on one charge of murder on April 10.

At his trial, Neal admitted that he and Bennett were separated at the time of her death but said that her death was accidental. He testified that on April 1, he had returned to the couple's Palm Springs home from Chicago, where he had been living, to see if a reconciliation were possible. Neal said the two began fighting after he accused Bennett of sleeping with other men. He claimed that Bennett pulled out a gun and held it to his head, and the two began to struggle. During the ensuing struggle, Neal said that the gun accidentally discharged, killing Bennett. Although prosecutors sought the death penalty, a jury convicted Neal of involuntary manslaughter on November 18, 1965. On December 10, he was sentenced to one-to-fifteen years in prison, of which he served six. On December 6, 1971, he was released on parole. After his release, Neal went back to working as a landscaper and gardener.

On August 7, 1972, Neal was found dead in his bed by his son at his home in North Hollywood, California. His death was later attributed to heart failure.

Amateur boxing record

Filmography

References

External links
 
 
 Prophet Without Honor

1914 births
1972 deaths
20th-century American criminals
20th-century American male actors
American male boxers
American male film actors
American male stage actors
American people convicted of manslaughter
American male television actors
Criminals from Los Angeles
Evanston Township High School alumni
Lake Forest Academy alumni
Male actors from Evanston, Illinois
Male actors from Los Angeles
Male actors from Palm Springs, California
Male Western (genre) film actors
Northwestern University alumni
Prisoners and detainees of California